Claude Hilton Matthews (19 January 1899 – 9 January 1954) was an Australian politician and a member of the New South Wales Legislative Assembly from 1934 until his death in 1954 . He was variously a  member of the Labor Party (ALP) and the Australian Labor Party (NSW). He held a number of ministerial positions including Chief Secretary

Early and personal life
Matthews was born in Rylstone, New South Wales He was the son of a foreman and was educated at Petersham High School. He worked with the New South Wales Government Railways as a labourer and became an official of the Federated Ironworkers' Association.

State Parliament
Matthews was elected as the Labor member for Leichhardt at the 1934 by-election caused by the resignation of the sitting member Joe Lamaro who unsuccessfully contested the seat of Watson at the 1934 federal election. He retained the seat for the next 7 elections. He committed suicide while still in office in 1954.

Government
Matthews held ministerial positions in the government of James McGirr. He held the positions of Minister for Building Materials and Minister for Tourism and Immigration before becoming Colonial Secretary between 1949 and 1950.

References

 

|-

1899 births
1954 deaths
Members of the New South Wales Legislative Assembly
Australian Labor Party members of the Parliament of New South Wales
20th-century Australian politicians
1954 suicides
Suicides in New South Wales
Australian politicians who committed suicide